The 2003–04 ISU Short Track Speed Skating World Cup was a multi-race tournament over a season for short track speed skating. The season began on 17 October 2003 and ended on 14 February 2004. The World Cup was organised by the International Skating Union who also ran world cups and championships in speed skating and figure skating.

The World Cup consisted of six tournaments in this season.

Calendar

Men

Canada

United States

Korea

China

Czech Republic

Italy

Women

Canada

United States

Korea

China

Czech Republic

Italy

Overall Standings

Men

Women

See also
 2004 World Short Track Speed Skating Championships
 2004 World Short Track Speed Skating Team Championships
 2004 European Short Track Speed Skating Championships

References

External Links
 Results for 2003-2004 SEASON at the International Skating Union

ISU Short Track Speed Skating World Cup
2003 in short track speed skating
2004 in short track speed skating